Cyperus varicus is a species of sedge that is native to Madagascar and the Comoros Islands.

See also 
 List of Cyperus species

References 

varicus
Plants described in 1936
Flora of Madagascar
Flora of the Comoros
Taxa named by Georg Kükenthal